Folke Nilsson may refer to:

 Folke Nilsson (cyclist), Swedish cyclist
 Folke Nilsson (footballer), Swedish footballer